Melchbourne is a village and former civil parish, now in the parish of Melchbourne and Yielden, in the Bedford district, in the ceremonial county of Bedfordshire, England. In 1931 the parish had a population of 160. On 1 April 1934 the parish was abolished to form "Melchbourne and Yelden".

The village is located west of Swineshead and east of Yelden.

Melchbourne Preceptory was located in the village. Today the village is the location of the Church of St Mary Magdalene.

Notable residents

 Audrey Lawson-Johnston, the last living survivor of the sinking of the RMS Lusitania in 1915.
 Sarah Kennedy, BBC radio presenter. Moved 2012
 Major Gen; Sir Percy Cox, British Diplomat (died there 1937) Influential figure in founding of Iraq.

References

Villages in Bedfordshire
Former civil parishes in Bedfordshire
Borough of Bedford